Hits and Misses may refer to:

Literature
Hits and Misses (The Hardy Boys), a 1993 Nancy Drew and Hardy Boys Supermystery crossover novel
 Hits and Misses, a 2018 short story collection by Simon Rich

Music
Greatest Hits... and Misses a 1989 compilation album by American actor, singer and songwriter Paul Jabara
 Hits (Joni Mitchell album) and Misses (album), companion albums released by Joni Mitchell in 1996

Other uses
"Hits and Misses", a song by Stiff Little Fingers from Go for It
 "Hits and Misses", a season 2 episode of Romeo!

See also
 Hit and miss (disambiguation)